Avhustynivka is a village (a selo) in the Zaporizhzhia Raion (district) of Zaporizhzhia Oblast in southern Ukraine. Its population was 1,017 in the 2001 Ukrainian Census. Avhustynivka is the administrative center of the Avhustynivka Rural Council, a local government area.

The village was formed in 1921 as the village of Hnativka; in 1929 it was renamed to Avhustynivka, after 153 families were resettled to the village after the fooding of the village of Avhustynivka following the creation of the Dnieper Hydroelectric Station. The original village of Avhustynivka was founded in 1780.

References

Populated places established in 1921
Populated places established in the Ukrainian Soviet Socialist Republic

Villages in Zaporizhzhia Raion
Zaporizhzhia Raion